Brunei and Germany established diplomatic relations in 1984. Brunei has an embassy in Berlin, and Germany has an embassy in Bandar Seri Begawan.

History 
Relations between the two countries has been established since 1 May 1984. In 1985, His Majesty Sultan Hassanal Bolkiah paid a first private visit to Germany and in 1998 made a state visit while an official visit was made on 2002 and 2011. In other side, Chancellor Helmut Kohl paid an official visit to Brunei on 1997.

Economic relations 
Brunei views Germany as an important economic partner with bilateral trade increased in 2011 to approximately €346 million. Germany exports to Brunei are mainly in cars, machinery, chemicals and heavy equipment. There is also a ratification of an agreement on the encouragement and reciprocal protection of investment between both countries.

Education relations 
There is also a student exchange program between Brunei and Germany which was initiated in 2008 when a group of Bruneian students went to German universities to study.

Further reading 
 Germany, Brunei to discuss 'a whole range of issues' The Brunei Times

See also  
 Foreign relations of Brunei
 Foreign relations of Germany

References 

Germany
Bilateral relations of Germany